Plug In and Hang On: Live in Tokyo is a live album by heavy metal band Vicious Rumors, released in 1992.

The material for this CD was recorded in Kawasaki, Japan at Club Citta.

Track listing
"Abandoned"
"Savior from Anger"
"Down to the Temple"
"Ship of Fools"
"Lady Took a Chance"
"When Love Comes Down"
"March or Die"
"Don't Wait for Me"

Personnel
 Geoff Thorpe: Guitars
 Mark McGee: Guitars
 Carl Albert: Vocals
 Dave Starr: Bass
 Larry Howe: Drums

1992 live albums
Vicious Rumors albums